Venta Plateau is a small plateau rising to 1,800-2,000 m between the heads of Isca Valley and Lemanis Valley, located 4 nautical miles (7 km) east of Haven Mountain in the Britannia Range. Named in association with Britannia by a University of Waikato (N.Z.) geological party, 1978–79, led by Michael Selby. Venta is a historical name used in Roman Britain for present-day Winchester.

Plateaus of Oates Land